Robert Howard White  (25 December 1914 – 4 January 2006) was a New Zealand local-body politician.

Biography
Born in Auckland on 25 December 1914, White was the son of Amy Charlotte and Alfred Horace White. He was educated at Seddon Memorial Technical College from 1927 to 1930. In 1941, he married Kitty Gwendolyn Mawkes, and the couple went on to have three children.

White served in the Royal New Zealand Air Force.

White was mayor of Papatoetoe from 1965 to 1986. During his tenure in the 1970s, he advocated for a rapid-rail system connecting South Auckland with Auckland City. In 1981 he successfully called for the inclusion of photographs on drivers licenses in an effort to reduce fraud.

In 1977, White received the Queen Elizabeth II Silver Jubilee Medal. In the 1982 New Year Honours, he was made a Queen's Service Order for public services.  In 1975, he was appointed an Officer of the Order of St John, and in 1985 he was promoted to Commander of the Order of St John. In 1990, White was awarded the New Zealand 1990 Commemoration Medal.

Robert White Park in Papatoetoe is named after White.

References

1914 births
2006 deaths
Mayors of Papatoetoe
Companions of the Queen's Service Order
Commanders of the Order of St John
20th-century New Zealand politicians
New Zealand justices of the peace
New Zealand military personnel of World War II